The 2003–04 season was the 80th season in the existence of AEK Athens F.C. and the 45th consecutive season in the top flight of Greek football. They competed in the Alpha Ethniki, the Greek Cup and the UEFA Champions League. The season began on 17 August 2003 and finished on 22 May 2004.

Overview
The summer of 2003 started with severe financial and administrative problems for another season in the history of AEK. The administration of the court of first instance was trying to put the club in an order after the "mess" of Psomiadis and things were very difficult, while the "star" of the team, Demis Nikolaidis also left for Atlético Madrid. Everything looked disappointing, but suddenly, in the summer, the climate reversed after some strong transfers were made with the acquisition of Nikos Liberopoulos and Ioannis Okkas with the help of the then outsider, Dimitris Melissanidis, while almost all the other players of the very good roster of the previous year remained.

While the roster was very good, the atmosphere was very bad and so the team ultimately presented a bad image. The players were unpaid, Bajević was permanently at odds with some of the fans, without showing that he was still the coach he used to be, and as if all this was not enough, the team was roaming around various stadiums in Attica, since the Nikos Goumas Stadium had now been demolished. The result was the resignation of Bajević after the 18th matchday, the taking over of the technical leadership by the Romanian Ilie Dumitrescu and eventually finishing at the 4th place of the league with the players presenting themselves far below their value and the team looking disjointed and weak throughout during the season.

AEK had the opportunity to compete for the second consecutive season in the Champions League groups, and the need for this to happen became even more imperative for financial reasons, since the team was facing huge financial problems. On its way, the Swiss Grasshopper and the yellow-blacks were considered favorites for qualification. In the first match at the Hardturm, the AEK did not appear ready and the Swiss had the upper hand and even if they became more threatening offensively in the second half, the Swiss team scored, the match ended 1–0 and things became difficult for the Greek team. The rematch that took place at the Leoforos Alexandras Stadium with AEK entering the match very strongly and with 2 goals and an own goal were already getting a qualifying score by the 39th minute. In the second half, however, Grasshoppers scored, but AEK responded with a goal by Liberopoulos and in the last minutes the Swiss team put a lot of pressure on the Greek team without finally being able to score the goal that would have given them qualification. Thus, AEK qualified for a second year in a row in the group stage of the Champions League and were drawn with Monaco, Deportivo La Coruña and PSV Eindhoven, where they finished last after 2 draws and 4 defeats.

In the Greek Cup, AEK first eliminated Doxa Drama then they qualified without an opponent to the Round of 16, where they also eliminated Agrotikos Asteras and then they faced Iraklis, where they also got an easy qualification. In the semi-finals AEK came across Panathinaikos. The first match at the Apostolos Nikolaidis Stadium ended 2–2 with both teams scoring one goal each towards the end of the match. In the rematch at Giannis Pathiakakis Stadium, the yellow-blacks appeared inferior to the circumstances, ultimately losing with 0–1 and thus they were eliminated from the final.

As the season progressed, the team's financial and administrative situation appeared to have reached its limits, with the result that the very existence of the club was threatened. Top scorer of this bad season in the league for AEK, Nikos Limberopoulos with 13 goals, while Vasilios Lakis scored 10 goals.

Players

Squad information

NOTE: The players are the ones that have been announced by the AEK Athens' press release. No edits should be made unless a player arrival or exit is announced. Updated 30 June 2004, 23:59 UTC+3.

Transfers

In

Summer

Winter

Out

Summer

Winter

Notes

 a.  Plus 25% of resale.

 b.  Georgatos paid €400,000 to AEK Athens for his contract termination so he could rejoin Olympiacos.

Loan out

Summer

Winter

Renewals

Overall transfer activity

Expenditure
Summer:  €460,000

Winter:  €0

Total:  €460,000

Income
Summer:  €0

Winter:  €0

Total:  €0

Net Totals
Summer:  €460,000

Winter:  €0

Total:  €460,000

Pre-season and friendlies

Alpha Ethniki

League table

Results summary

Results by Matchday

Fixtures

Greek Cup

First round

Second round
AEK Athens qualified to the Round of 16 without a match.

Round of 16

Quarter-finals

Semi-finals

UEFA Champions League

Third qualifying round

Group stage

Statistics

Squad statistics

! colspan="13" style="background:#FFDE00; text-align:center" | Goalkeepers
|-

! colspan="13" style="background:#FFDE00; color:black; text-align:center;"| Defenders
|-

! colspan="13" style="background:#FFDE00; color:black; text-align:center;"| Midfielders
|-

! colspan="13" style="background:#FFDE00; color:black; text-align:center;"| Forwards
|-

! colspan="13" style="background:#FFDE00; color:black; text-align:center;"| Left during Winter Transfer Window
|-

|-
|}

Disciplinary record

|-
! colspan="17" style="background:#FFDE00; text-align:center" | Goalkeepers

|-
! colspan="17" style="background:#FFDE00; color:black; text-align:center;"| Defenders

|-
! colspan="17" style="background:#FFDE00; color:black; text-align:center;"| Midfielders

|-
! colspan="17" style="background:#FFDE00; color:black; text-align:center;"| Forwards

|-
! colspan="17" style="background:#FFDE00; color:black; text-align:center;"| Left during Winter Transfer window

|-
|}

Starting 11

References

External links
masternews.gr  Kit source
AEK Athens F.C. Official Website

2003-04
Greek football clubs 2003–04 season